Ilona Vargha (8 June 1910 – 19 April 1973) was a Hungarian fencer. She competed in the women's individual foil event at the 1936 Summer Olympics.

References

External links
 

1910 births
1973 deaths
Hungarian female foil fencers
Olympic fencers of Hungary
Fencers at the 1936 Summer Olympics
Martial artists from Budapest